Maleic acid or cis-butenedioic acid is an organic compound that is a dicarboxylic acid, a molecule with two carboxyl groups. Its chemical formula is HO2CCH=CHCO2H. Maleic acid is the cis-isomer of butenedioic acid, whereas fumaric acid is the trans-isomer.  It is mainly used as a precursor to fumaric acid, and relative to its parent maleic anhydride, maleic acid has few applications.

Physical properties 
Maleic acid has a heat of combustion of -1,355 kJ/mol., 22.7 kJ/mol higher than that of fumaric acid.  Maleic acid is more soluble in water than fumaric acid. The melting point of maleic acid (135 °C) is also much lower than that of fumaric acid (287 °C). Both properties of maleic acid can be explained on account of the intramolecular hydrogen bonding that takes place in maleic acid at the expense of intermolecular interactions, and that are not possible in fumaric acid for geometric reasons.

Production and industrial applications
In industry, maleic acid is derived by hydrolysis of maleic anhydride, the latter being produced by oxidation of benzene or butane.

Maleic acid is an industrial raw material for the production of glyoxylic acid by ozonolysis.

Maleic acid may be used to form acid addition salts with drugs to make them more stable, such as indacaterol maleate.

Maleic acid is also used as an adhesion promoter for different substrates, such as nylon and zinc coated metals e.g galvanized steel, in methyl methacrylate based adhesives.

Isomerization to fumaric acid
The major industrial use of maleic acid is its conversion to fumaric acid. This conversion, an isomerization, is catalysed by a variety of reagents, such as mineral acids and thiourea. Again, the large difference in water solubility makes fumaric acid purification easy.

The isomerization is a popular topic in schools.  Maleic acid and fumaric acid do not spontaneously interconvert because rotation around a carbon carbon double bond is not energetically favourable. However, conversion of the cis isomer into the trans isomer is possible by photolysis in the presence of a small amount of bromine. Light converts elemental bromine into a bromine radical, which attacks the alkene in a radical addition reaction to a bromo-alkane radical; and now single bond rotation is possible.  The bromine radicals recombine and fumaric acid is formed. In another method (used as a classroom demonstration), maleic acid is transformed into fumaric acid through the process of heating the maleic acid in hydrochloric acid solution. Reversible addition (of H+) leads to free rotation about the central C-C bond and formation of the more stable and less soluble fumaric acid.

Some bacteria produce the enzyme maleate isomerase, which is used by bacteria in nicotinate metabolism. This enzyme catalyses isomerization between fumarate and maleate.

Other reactions
Although not practised commercially, maleic acid can be converted into maleic anhydride by dehydration, to malic acid by hydration, and to succinic acid by hydrogenation (ethanol / palladium on carbon). It reacts with thionyl chloride or phosphorus pentachloride to give the maleic acid chloride (it is not possible to isolate the mono acid chloride).  Maleic acid, being electrophilic, participates as a dienophile in many Diels-Alder reactions.

Maleates
The maleate ion is the ionized form of maleic acid. The maleate ion is useful in biochemistry as an inhibitor of transaminase reactions. Maleic acid esters are also called maleates, for instance dimethyl maleate.

Use in pharmaceutical drugs
Many drugs that contain amines are provided as the maleate acid salt, e.g. carfenazine, chlorpheniramine, pyrilamine, methylergonovine, and thiethylperazine.

See also
 Fumaric acid
 Malic acid
 Malonic acid
 Succinic acid

References

External links

 International Chemical Safety Card 1186
 Calculator: Water and solute activities in aqueous maleic acid

Dicarboxylic acids
Enoic acids